Scott Gregory Loucks (born 1956) is a former Major League Baseball outfielder. In none of those seasons did he accumulate more than 49 at bats or 11 hits.

Sources

Major League Baseball outfielders
Houston Astros players
Pittsburgh Pirates players
Gulf Coast Astros players
Daytona Beach Astros players
Southeastern Oklahoma State Savage Storm baseball players
Columbus Astros players
Tucson Toros players
Indianapolis Indians players
Hawaii Islanders players
Baseball players from Alaska
1956 births
Living people
Sportspeople from Anchorage, Alaska